Benoît Roux is an Amgen Professor of Biochemistry and Molecular Biophysics at the University of Chicago. He has previously taught at University of Montreal and Weill Medical College of Cornell University. Benoît Roux was a recipient of the 1998 Rutherford Memorial Medal in Chemistry, awarded by the Royal Society of Canada.

Life and career
Roux obtained B.Sc. and M.Sc. in physics from the University of Montreal in 1981 and 1984 respectively. He completed his Ph.D. at Harvard University under the supervision of Martin Karplus, graduating in 1990. He served at the French Alternative Energies and Atomic Energy Commission from 1991 to 1992 and was a Foreign Research Fellow at the Centre D’Etudes. He was a faculty member in the Department of Physics at the Université de Montréal until 1999, when he relocated to Weill Cornell Medicine. He relocated to the Department of Biochemistry and Molecular Biology at the University of Chicago in 2005. He also serves as a research scientist at the Center for Nanoscale Materials, a department of the Argonne National Laboratory. He is an accomplished classical pianist, specializing in the work of Frédéric Chopin.

Research
His laboratory at the University of Chicago mostly uses theoretical techniques, such as classical molecular dynamics, to understand the functioning of biological systems at the molecular level. His research has investigated structure, dynamics, and the function of biological macromolecular systems such as ion channels, receptors, and protein kinases.

He is a pioneer in the study of membrane proteins using molecular dynamics with explicit phospholipid molecules and solvent.
His laboratory has also developed novel computational methods to improve efficiency and applicability of theoretical investigations to molecular recognition phenomena. His work has bridged theory and experiment in biophysics by employing ever-increasing computational power to further the understanding of the molecular basis of life.

Works
In 1996, he co-authored Biological Membranes: A Molecular Perspective from Computation and Experiment with Kenneth M. Merz. In 2021, he authored a text on biophysical simulation, Computational Modeling and Simulations of Biomolecular Systems.

Honors, awards, and fellowships
Journal of Computational Chemistry: Special Issue on Membrane Protein Simulations and Free Energy Approaches in honor of Professor Benoit Roux's 60th birthday
Rutherford Memorial Medal, Royal Society of Canada (1998)
Fellow of the Biophysical Society of Canada (2017)
Fellow of the Royal Society of Canada (2021)

References

External links

Benoît Roux Laboratory at the University of Chicago

20th-century births
Living people
American biochemists
Canadian biochemists
Harvard University alumni
Université de Montréal alumni
Academic staff of the Université de Montréal
Cornell University faculty
University of Chicago faculty
Fellows of the Royal Society of Canada
Canadian emigrants to the United States
Year of birth missing (living people)